Gardiner Ridge  is a ridge extending from Mount Kauffman to Mount Kosciusko in the Ames Range of Marie Byrd Land, Antarctica. It was mapped by the United States Geological Survey from surveys and U.S. Navy air photos, 1959–65, and was named by the Advisory Committee on Antarctic Names for James E. Gardiner, U.S. Navy, a Construction Driver and member of the Army–Navy Trail Party which blazed trail from Little America V to establish Byrd Station in 1956.

References

Ridges of Marie Byrd Land
Ames Range